Spirits Walking Out is the debut solo album by Kit Hain. The track "Danny" became a minor success in the charts. The tracks "Looking for You" and "Parting Would be Painless" were both covered by Roger Daltrey and released on his solo album Parting Should Be Painless (released in 1984).

The LP was released in the USA by Mercury Records under the title Looking for You, with a slightly different tracklisting.

Track listing
All tracks written by Kit Hain

Side 1
 "Force Grown"
 "I'm the One Who's with You"
 "Uninvited Guests"
 "Aaron"
 "Awaking Again"
Side 2
 "Looking for You	
 "Danny"
 "Spirits Walking Out"
 "Parting Would Be Painless"
 "You Are the One"

The US edition replaces the songs "You are the One" and "Force Grown" for "Inner Ring" and "Survivors."

Personnel
 Kit Hain – lead vocals, piano, synthesizer, guitar
 Brian Holloway – bass guitar
 Bob Jenkins – drums
 Martin Ditcham – percussion
 Mike Thorne – synthesizer

References

External links

1981 debut albums
Albums produced by Mike Thorne
Deram Records albums